Lago d'Isola is a reservoir at San Bernardino, Grisons, Switzerland.

See also
List of lakes of Switzerland
List of mountain lakes of Switzerland

External links

Reservoirs in Switzerland
Lakes of Graubünden
Mesocco